Silvanops is a genus of beetles in the family Silvanidae, containing the following species:

 Silvanops angulicollis Reitter
 Silvanops columbinus Grouvelle
 Silvanops perforatus Sharp

References

Silvanidae genera